Hans Siemensmeyer (born 23 September 1940) is a retired German football player and coach.

Career
As a player, he spent nine seasons in the Bundesliga with Hannover 96. He also represented Germany three times, including a UEFA Euro 1968 qualifier against Yugoslavia and two friendlies. He scored two goals in a 5–1 win over France.

External links
 
 

1940 births
Living people
German footballers
Germany international footballers
Bundesliga players
Rot-Weiß Oberhausen players
Hannover 96 players
TSV Havelse players
German football managers
TSV Havelse managers
Hannover 96 managers
Association football midfielders
Sportspeople from Oberhausen
Footballers from North Rhine-Westphalia